Dream School is an American reality television series on SundanceTV that premiered on October 7, 2013.

The series follows 15 high school dropouts as they are taught by a series of celebrity "teachers", including lawyer and rights activist Gloria Allred, actor David Arquette, author Rabbi Shmuley Boteach, conservationist Jeff Corwin, civil rights activist Jesse Jackson, astronaut Mae Jemison, television journalist Soledad O'Brien, financial advisor Suze Orman, filmmaker Oliver Stone, and musician Swizz Beatz.

The series is an adaptation of British television show Jamie's Dream School, created by celebrity chef Jamie Oliver. It is produced by Oliver and rapper Curtis "50 Cent" Jackson.

Episodes

Season 1 (2013)

Season 2 (2014)
On May 19, 2014, SundanceTV renewed the series for a second season, which premiered Wednesday, October 1 at 10/9c.

Faculty

 Principal – Dr. Steven Keller
 Advisors – Scott Whitney, Tizoc Brenes, and Emily Bautista

Celebrity teachers

First season

Art
 Swizz Beatz (Music)
 Chris Jordan (Photography)
 Roy Choi (Cooking)

English
 Cliff Dorfman (Writing/Literature)
 Soledad O’Brien (Journalism)

Homeroom
 Curtis “50 Cent” Jackson
 David Arquette

Science
 Dr. Mae Jemison (Earth Science)
 Cara Santa Maria (Physical Science)
 Jeff Corwin (Biology)
 Fabien Cousteau (Physics)

Social Studies
 Oliver Stone (World History)
 Suze Orman (Economics)
 Rev. Jesse Jackson (Political Science)

Second season

 lawyer and rights activist Gloria Allred
 Rabbi Shmuley Boteach (author of Kosher Jesus and Kosher Sex)
 chef and restaurateur David Chang
 Emmy award-winning screenwriter and director Cliff Dorfman (Entourage)
 historian David Eisenbach
 financial educator Alvin Hall
 journalists Ana Kasparian and Cenk Uygur
 survival expert Les Stroud
 Olympic figure skater Johnny Weir
 actor Dean Winters

References

2010s American reality television series
2013 American television series debuts
English-language television shows
Sundance TV original programming
2014 American television series endings
Television series by G-Unit Films and Television Inc.